Bandar Khamir (also Romanized as Bandar Khamīr, Bandar-e Khamīr; also, simply Khamīr or Xamir) is a city and capital of Khamir County, Hormozgan Province, Iran. Bandar Khamir is a city with the population of 20,150 people located in Hormozgan province and on the azure shores of the Persian Gulf, this historic port is the largest city near Khoorkhooran wetland; a wetland which is the largest wetland in the Middle East and has the widest mangrove forests in Iran, also this port has the longest wetland shore in Iran, which due to years of environmental activities and high participation of people in the preservation and development of this wetland, Bandar Khamir was introduced as the first national wetland city in Iran and became World Wetland City in 2022.

This city was selected as a UNESCO Learning City in 2021 due to its extensive activities and education to different segments of the population. This city is now recognized in Iran and the world as one of the models of sustainable development based on people's participation.

In addition to mangrove forests and wetlands, this city has unique natural attractions such as hot springs, domes, salt ponds and landmarks such as the historic castle and Latidan bridge which is the longest historical bridge in Iran.

The rich culture of people is crystallized through coexistence with wetlands, sea and historical and maritime connections with other countries of the world from India to Africa and Arab countries in various cases such as history, music, clothes, food, language, architecture and many more, these features attract tourists so much that it is unlikely that after visiting this city and meeting these people, they were not impressed by their hospitality, culture and humanity.

Bandar Khamir includes five villages named Upper Lashtaghān, Lower Lashtaghān, Kandāl, Baghi Abād, and Chah Sahāri.

References 

Populated places in Khamir County
Cities in Hormozgan Province
Port cities and towns in Iran